Carl Sör Lancelot Hedman, also known as Lancelot Hedman Graaf (born 21 July 2000) is a Swedish singer. He competed in Melodifestivalen 2022 with the song ”Lyckligt slut”. He has starred in his own reality series Lance vs livet on TV3. He competed as a celebrity dancer in Let's Dance 2019 broadcast on TV4. In 2021, he participated in the TV show Behandlingen on Kanal 5.

His father is footballer Magnus Hedman, and his mother is model Magdalena Graaf.

Discography

Singles

References

2000 births
Living people
Melodifestivalen contestants of 2022